In mathematics, crystals are Cartesian sections of certain fibered categories. In particular quasicoherent crystals over the crystalline site are analogous to quasicoherent modules over a scheme. 

An isocrystal  is a crystal up to isogeny. Convergent isocrystals are a variation of isocrystals that work better over non-perfect fields, and overconvergent isocrystals are another variation related to overconvergent cohomology theories.

A Dieudonné crystal is a crystal with Verschiebung and Frobenius maps. An F-crystal is a structure in semilinear algebra somewhat related to crystals.

Crystals over the infinitesimal and crystalline sites

If  is a scheme over  then the sheaf  is defined by 
Sheaves on this site grow in the sense that they can be extended from open sets to infinitesimal extensions of open sets. 

A crystal on the site  is a sheaf  of  modules that is rigid in the following sense:
This is similar to the definition of a quasicoherent sheaf of modules in the Zariski topology.

An example of a crystal is the sheaf .

Crystals on the crystalline site 
are defined in a similar way.

Crystals in fibered categories

References
 

 

  (letter to Atiyah, Oct. 14 1963)

 
 

Algebraic geometry